Pine Island is an unincorporated community in Horry County, South Carolina, United States. Pine Island began as an experimental farm in the early 1900s, when the train to Myrtle Beach had been chartered from Conway to the Pine Island area. The train would eventually run to Myrtle Beach a year later. A store was constructed in the area, which provided feed for animals, fresh meat, and eggs. A lumber mill was built, which provided wood for Myrtle Beach's first buildings and structures, including the Seaside Inn, Myrtle Beach's first hotel. The experimental farm was managed as a factory, as the farm was laid off in tracts and records were kept. The experimental farm failed and the landowner had to sell. Currently, the area of Pine Island has grown, constructing new residential developments, and a few industrial businesses.

The community is located within the Carolina Forest CDP.

Notes

Unincorporated communities in Horry County, South Carolina
Unincorporated communities in South Carolina